Hailie Sahar (born July 12, 1988) is an American actress. She is known for her performance as Lulu Abundance, later co-founder of the House of Ferocity in the TV series, Pose.

Early life 
Sahar's father was a preacher in a Baptist church and she grew up in a religious household in Los Angeles. Sahar has five brothers. As a child, Sahar was a dancer for L.A.'s WNBA team, the Sparks. Sahar participated in Los Angeles Ball scene, and at 18, she became one of the youngest leaders of a house in the ball community by becoming the "mother" of the House of Rodeo, roughly a year after initially joining the house. Later, Sahar moved to the House of Allure. She describes herself as a woman of trans experience.

Career 
Sahar landed her first on-screen role in 2011's Leave It on the Floor. She was also cast as a minor character in USA's Mr. Robot and Amazon's Transparent. Sahar also starred in the Off-Broadway production of Charm. Sahar portrays Lulu as part of the main cast of Pose, an FX TV series that began in 2018. In 2019 Sahar began playing the recurring character Jazmin on the Freeform TV show Good Trouble.

Filmography

Film

Television

Awards 
 2015 Winner of Queen USA Pageant

References

External links

Living people
1988 births
21st-century American actresses
African-American fashion designers
American fashion designers
American women fashion designers
Transgender actresses
LGBT people from California
Actresses from Los Angeles
LGBT African Americans
21st-century African-American women
21st-century African-American people
20th-century African-American people
American LGBT actors
20th-century African-American women